Žilinai is a village in Jakėnų eldership, Varėna District Municipality, Alytus County, in southeastern Lithuania. As of the 2011 census, the population was 392.

History 
In the 19th century, the settlement was the site of a manor and village. During the Soviet Lithuania era, it was the seat of the Žilinai District from 1950 to 1959 and was the site of a collective farm.

Geography 
The village is located in southeastern Lithuania, in the northern part of Varėna District Municipality. The nearest town is Onuškis,  to the north. The surrounding landscape is made up of marshland, peat bog and forest, with several lakes also nearby, including Lake Lielukas, Lake Netečius, Lake Steginis, and Lake Juodikis.

Demographics 
As of the census of 2011, there were 392 people, of which 46.9% were male and 53.1% female.

As of the census of 2001, there were 459 people, of which 47.3% were male and 52.7% female.

Transportation 

The village lies on the national road K4724 (Onuškis – Žilinai – Puodžiai) with links north and south.

Points of interest 

 Church of St Anthony of Padua, a wooden Catholic church built in 1927

References

Villages in Varėna District Municipality